Danville Smith is a South African politician who serves as a Member of the Western Cape Provincial Parliament for the African National Congress. Smith is the ANC's spokesperson on local government.

On 12 May 2021, Smith voluntarily stepped aside as a member of the provincial parliament, in line with the party's national executive committee resolution, as he has been charged with fraud and corruption. He had allegedly stolen R25,000 by submitting a fraudulent food parcel invoice for a Mandela Day event, when he was a ward councillor in Lamberts Bay. Smith is the first ANC politician in the Western Cape to have stepped aside from their position.

References

External links

Living people
African National Congress politicians
Members of the Western Cape Provincial Parliament
Year of birth missing (living people)